Haviland Haines Lund (December 25, 1871 – ?) was the head of the Forward-to-the-Land League which advocated for unemployed city men in America to go to rural areas and become farmers. She was vice president and editorial director of Little Farms Magazine. She was president of the Institute of Government. She was the inspector of home settlement projects for the United States Department of the Interior.

Biography

She was born on December 25, 1871, in Adrian, Michigan, as Haviland Haines. She married Adolph Lund (?-1905) of Denmark. He died in 1905 in Chicago, Illinois. By 1910, she was living in Pasadena, California. She was still alive in the Los Angeles area in 1913.

References

1871 births
People from Adrian, Michigan
United States Department of the Interior officials
Year of death unknown
American agrarianists
American women editors